Harabarjan (also Romanized as Harābarjān and Herābarjān; also known as Arāvjūn, Haravarjūn, and Harvarjun) is a village in, and the capital of, Harabarjan Rural District of the Central District of Marvast County, Yazd province, Iran. At the 2006 National Census, its population was 563 in 189 households. The following census in 2011 counted 573 people in 195 households. The latest census in 2016 showed a population of 849 people in 289 households.

References 

Populated places in Yazd Province